The Group of Fifty (Grupo de los Cincuenta, or G-50) is a non-profit, pro-business initiative based in Washington, D.C., USA, whose primary goal is to foster open dialogue among members of the business community in Latin America to promote economic development and social progress in the region.

The Group of Fifty (G50) is composed of a select group of executives who lead some of the most successful and influential private business enterprises in the Americas across a wide variety of industrial sectors. The idea for the organization was first conceptualized by Moisés Naím in 1993 under the auspices of the oldest foreign policy think-tank in the United States, the Carnegie Endowment for International Peace. It is a non-profit organization that has no partisan, ideological, religious, or commercial affiliations. G50 members meet regularly to address changes as they appear in different sectors and markets, to hear from their peers in other countries about alternative business strategies, and to compare experiences and exchange ideas about the future of the hemisphere, its economies and its politics.  With a twenty-year track-record of in-depth dialogue at the highest levels, the G50 has evolved into one of the top gatherings of owners and CEO’s of Latin America’s most important companies.

In 2011, the Group of Fifty launched the Millennium Leaders (ML50) to incorporate an emerging generation of young business leaders and entrepreneurs under 40 years of age.

External links
G50 Official website

Non-profit organizations based in Washington, D.C.